Kanwarlal Meena (born 1 July 1974) is an Indian MLA who has represented the district of Manohar Thana in Rajasthan state since 2013.

Early life 
Kanwarlal Meena was born on 1 July 1974 in Tharol. He is the son of Kanchan Bai and Purilal Meena, farmers, resident of Tharol village, located on NH 52, near Aklera. He completed his secondary school education from government school, Tharol.

References 

Members of the Rajasthan Legislative Assembly
1974 births
Living people